Perforatus (South European Acorn Barnacle, Red-striped Acorn Barnacle) is a genus of acorn barnacles in the family Balanidae. There is one described species in Perforatus, P. perforatus.

References

External links

 

Barnacles